The St. Ignatius Loyola Church in Denver, Colorado is a historic church at the junction of E. 23rd Ave. and York Street.  It was built in 1924 and was added to the National Register of Historic Places in 1994.

It has a truncated cruciform plan.

It was designed by the architectural firm of Mountjoy and Frewen.

References

External links 
 Official website

Roman Catholic churches in Denver
Roman Catholic churches completed in 1924
National Register of Historic Places in Denver
Churches on the National Register of Historic Places in Colorado
Gothic Revival church buildings in Colorado
20th-century Roman Catholic church buildings in the United States
African-American Roman Catholic churches